Couttet is a French surname. Notable people with the surname include:

Denis Couttet (1900–1956), French cross country skier
Henri Couttet (1901–1953), French ice hockey player
James Couttet (1921–1997), French alpine skier and ski jumper
Lucienne Schmidt-Couttet (1926–2022), French alpine skier, wife of James Couttet

French-language surnames